The 1974 NCAA Division II Men's Soccer Championship was the third annual tournament held by the NCAA to determine the top men's Division II college soccer program in the United States.

With the introduction of separate tournament for Division III programs this season, the Division II tournament field decreased from 25 to 16. 

Adelphi defeated Seattle Pacific in the final match, 3–2, to win their first national title. The final was played at the University of Missouri–St. Louis in St. Louis, Missouri on November 30, 1974.

Bracket

Final

See also  
 1974 NCAA Division I Soccer Tournament
 1974 NCAA Division III Soccer Championship
 1974 NAIA Soccer Championship

References 

NCAA Division II Men's Soccer Championship
NCAA Division II Men's Soccer Championship
NCAA Division II Soccer Championship
NCAA Division II Men's Soccer Championship